Join Inn is the fourth album by Krautrock band Ash Ra Tempel. It was recorded at Studio Dierks by Dieter Dierks during breaks in the sessions for the Walter Wegmüller album Tarot. It was originally released on LP by Ohr in Berlin, catalogue number OMM 556032. Each side of the LP comprises one long track.

Join Inn marks the end of the collaboration with Klaus Schulze. However, together with Ash Ra Tempel, their eponymous first album, it is considered a highlight of the Krautrock movement.

Track listing
All tracks composed by Manuel Göttsching, Hartmut Enke and Klaus Schulze.
"Freak 'n' Roll" – 19:15
"Jenseits" – 24:18

Personnel
Hartmut Enke – bass
Manuel Göttsching – guitar
Rosi Müller – vocals (credited as 'Rosi')
Klaus Schulze – drums, organ, Synthi A

References

Ash Ra Tempel albums
1973 albums
Ohr (record label) albums